The University of Pennsylvania Press (or Penn Press) is a university press affiliated with the University of Pennsylvania located in Philadelphia, Pennsylvania. 

The press was originally incorporated with the Commonwealth of Pennsylvania on 26 March 1890, and the imprint of the University of Pennsylvania Press first appeared on publications in the 1890s, among the earliest such imprints in America. One of the press's first book publications, in 1899, was a landmark: The Philadelphia Negro: A Social Study, by renowned black reformer, scholar, and social critic W.E.B. Du Bois, a book that remains in print on the press's lists. 

Today the press has an active backlist of roughly 2,000 titles and an annual output of upward of 120 new books in a focused editorial program. Areas of special interest include American history and culture; ancient, medieval, and Renaissance studies; anthropology; landscape architecture; studio arts; human rights; Jewish studies; and political science. The press also publishes 16 peer-reviewed academic journals, mostly in the humanities, and the magazine Dissent.

The University of Pennsylvania Press, Inc., is a nonprofit Pennsylvania corporation wholly owned by the University of Pennsylvania, maintaining its own nonprofit tax status under Section 501(c)(3) of the United States Internal Revenue Code.

The press currently resides at 3905 Spruce Street in Philadelphia, Pennsylvania. The building housing the press is the former Potts House built by the Wilson Brothers & Company architecture firm in 1876. The house previously served as both the headquarters of International House Philadelphia and WXPN.

See also

 List of English-language book publishing companies
 List of university presses
 University of Pennsylvania Press academic journals
Journal of Austrian-American History

References

External links
University of Pennsylvania Press
Penn Press Log

 
1890 establishments in Pennsylvania
American companies established in 1890
Publishing companies established in 1890
Book publishing companies based in Pennsylvania
Companies based in Philadelphia
Pennsylvania